is a leading Japanese talent agency, headquartered in Shibuya, Tokyo. It was founded in 1979 and invests in entertainment forms including music, cinema, and modelling.

The agency has a dominant share in the management of actresses. For example, it manages Yūko Takeuchi (best known for the movie Be with You) and Kō Shibasaki (Socrates in Love).  The agency is known for its all-female musical groups such as Momoiro Clover Z, Shiritsu Ebisu Chugaku, and all-male musical groups such as Bullet Train, Dish and also has its own independent record label SDR (Stardust Records).

In 2009, Stardust Promotion opened a branch in South Korea.  In addition to the head office in Tokyo, Stardust Promotion has offices in Nagoya, in Osaka, and since lately in Fukuoka. The agency has recently started to put an emphasis on local talents and created several local idol groups, namely Team Syachihoko (in Nagoya) and Tacoyaki Rainbow (in Osaka).

Current notable roster

Actors 
Hayato Ichihara
Asaya Kimijima
Naruki Matsukawa
Kenji Mizuhashi
Win Morisaki
Taiga Nakano
Kippei Shiina
Seiyō Uchino
Atsuro Watabe
Takayuki Yamada
Kento Yamazaki
Tsuyoshi Furukawa
Taishi Nakagawa
Takumi Kitamura
Mizuki Itagaki
Kanata Hongō
Hiroki Ino
Ryusei Yokohama
Kousei Yuki
Sho Kiyohara
Munetaka Aoki
Masashi Goda
Gaku Hamada
Kai-Riki (Keita Riki)
Kento Hayashi
Takuji Kawakubo
Masataka Kubota
Riki Miura
Masaki Okada
Kazuma Sano
Taishi Nakagawa
Terunosuke Takezai
Koutaro Tanaka
Satoshi Tomiura
Yūya Yagira
Daiken Okudaira
Yuto Fuchino

Actresses 
Wakana Aoi
Shiori Akita
Tsubasa Honda
Rika Izumi
Hairi Katagiri
Yasuko Matsuyuki
Rie Mimura
Aoi Morikawa
Yumi Morio
Mei Nagano
Yurika Nakamura
Maki Sakai
Takako Tokiwa
Moe Yamaguchi
Momoka Tanabe
Hikaru Ohsawa
Rin Takanashi
Chihiro Yamamoto
Yuko Araki
Fumina Hara
Akari Hayami (former Momoiro Clover)
Mika Hijii
Yuka Hoshaku
Kaho
Keiko Kitagawa
Nana Komatsu
Rina Komiyama
Yuki Sakurai
Minori Hagiwara
Takayo Mimura
Yuika Motokariya
Runa Natsui
Erika Okuda
Aya Ōmasa
Phongchi (former Idoling!!!)
Megumi Sato
Megumi Seki
Kō Shibasaki
Kyoka Shibata
Shiho
Kanako Tahara
Yuko Takayama
Miori Takimoto (former SweetS)
Yuuka Yano
Rio Yamashita
Asuka Kishi

Voiceover talent 
Hiromu Mineta
Sachika Misawa

Models 
Yūki Mihara
Anri Okamoto
Rie
Rinka
Shelly
Arisa Sato
Shiori Sato
Emi Suzuki
Karen Takizawa
Kai-Riki

Musical artists 
Bullet Train 
Dish 
Kenichi Maeyamada
Vaundy

Stardust Planet talents
Momoiro Clover Z (Reni Takagi, Kanako Momota, Shiori Tamai, Ayaka Sasaki)
Shiritsu Ebisu Chugaku (Rika Mayama, Hinata Kashiwagi, Ayaka Yasumoto, Mirei Hoshina, Kaho Kobayashi, Riko Nakayama)
Team Shachi
Batten Showjo Tai
Tokimeki Sendenbu
Ukka
B.O.L.T
Amefurasshi
Iginari Tohoku San
Crown Pop
STARRY PLANET☆ (Kāya Date, Rio Ogura, Mizuki, Shizune Nagao, Rion Watanabe, Amy, Rurika Uno)

Others
Momoyo Koyama (voice actress)
Takahiro Miki (film director)
Maki Miyamae (tarento, former CoCo)
Orange Range (rock band)
K (singer)
June (singer)
Flower Flower (rock band)
Yui (singer)
Brother Tom
Yurina Uchiyama (voice actress)

Former Stardust Promotion artists 
Artists, managed by Stardust Promotion in the past.

Female 
Tomoko Akiya (voice actress)
Momoka Ariyasu (singer, former Momoiro Clover Z)
Anza (singer)
Miori Ichikawa (tarento, former AKB48 and NMB48)
Aiko Itō (actress)
Keiko Utoku (singer)
Anna Umemiya (model)
Ayumi Oka (actress)
Yukina Kashiwa (actress, former Momoiro Clover and Nogizaka46)
Mayu Gamō (actress)
Aya Kiguchi (gravure idol)
Ayumi Kinoshita (actress)
Haruna Kojima (former AKB48)
Izumi Sakai (singer, deceased)
 Erika Sawajiri (actress)
Mayumi Shintani (voice actress)
Hana Sugisaki (actress)
Kiki Sugino (actress)
Anri Sugihara (tarento)
Aya Sugimoto (tarento)
Risa Junna (actress)
Saki Takaoka (actress)
Miyu Takeuchi (former AKB48)
Makoto Takeda (tarento)
Anna Nagata (actress)
Miki Nakatani (actress)
Kaori Natori (singer)
Kyoko Hinami (actress)
Aika Hirota (singer, former Shiritsu Ebisu Chugaku)
 Lena Fujii (model)
Erina Masuda (announcer)
Rina Matsuno (former Shiritsu Ebisu Chugaku, died on 8 February 2017)
Hiroko Mita (actress)
Yūko Takeuchi (actress, died on 27 September 2020)
Narumi Uno (actress, voice actress, singer)

Male 
Masanobu Ando (actor)
Kei Inoo (idol, currently in Hey! Say! JUMP)
Kento Ono (actor)
Ryosei Konishi (actor)
Shōya Ishige (voice actor)
Shun Shioya (actor)
Kiyohiko Shibukawa (actor)
Sousuke Takaoka (actor)
Shinpei Takagi (former actor)
Manpei Takagi (actor)
Takayuki Tsubaki (actor)
Kenji Haga (former tarento)
Mokomichi Hayami (actor)
Yoshihiko Hosoda (actor)
Osamu Sato (boxer)
Yukihiro Takiguchi (deceased)
Fukuda Yusuke (Former Bullet Train)

Groups 
Zard (pop rock band)
Manish (pop band)
Mi-Ke (idol group)
Little by Little (pop rock band)
 Musashi's
CustomiZ
LAGOON
Le Lien
PrizmaX
Hachimitsu Rocket
Tacoyaki Rainbow
 Awwww!

See also 
 3B Junior
 Ebidan
 List of modeling agencies

References

External links 
 Stardust Promotion official website
 Stardust Pictures official website
 

 
Mass media companies based in Tokyo
Talent agencies based in Tokyo
Entertainment companies of Japan
Modeling agencies
Japanese voice actor management companies
Music companies of Japan
Japanese independent record labels
Mass media companies established in 1979
Japanese companies established in 1979
Japanese talent agencies